NRHP listings in South and Southeast Baltimore

The locations of the National Register properties and districts listed below (at least for all showing latitude and longitude coordinates below) may be seen in a map by clicking on "Map of all coordinates".

Main:List of RHPs in Baltimore

Current listings

|}

See also
National Register of Historic Places listings in Maryland

References

History of Baltimore
South